S v Van Zyl is an important case in South African law, heard in the Orange Free State Provincial Division by Steyn J and Malherbe J on 10 February 1986, with judgment handed down on 27 February. The court found that the crime of arson can be committed by a person who sets fire to his own immovable property with the intention of harming another in his property.

See also 
 Arson
 Crime in South Africa
 Law of South Africa
 South African criminal law

References

Case law 
 S v Van Zyl 1987 (1) SA 497 (O).

Notes 

1986 in South African law
1986 in case law